Major General Robert Chauncey Macon (July 12, 1890 – October 20, 1980) was a senior United States Army officer who commanded the 7th Infantry Regiment and the 83rd Infantry Division during World War II in Western Europe and later served as military attaché in Moscow.

Early life
Macon graduated from Virginia Polytechnic Institute in 1912 with a B.S. degree and received an M.E. from the same institution the following year. He also played college football for the university.  He was commissioned a Second Lieutenant of Infantry in 1916.  He served in China as the commander of Company I, 15th Infantry Regiment from 1919 to 1921. He was then a professor of military science and tactics at Virginia Polytechnic Institute from 1924 to 1928.  After graduation from the U.S. Army Command and General Staff School on June 19, 1931, he served in the Panama Canal Department until 1933.  He then attended the U.S. Army War College and from 1934 to 1939 was an instructor at the U.S. Army Infantry School.  Macon served as assistant chief of staff for plans in VII Corps from March to August 1940, and then served with the 6th Armored Infantry Regiment until 1941.  He was then assigned as assistant chief of staff for supply of the 4th Armored Division.

World War II
In April 1942, Macon, now a colonel, took command of the 7th Infantry Regiment, 3rd Infantry Division.  He commanded the regiment during Operation Torch, the invasion of North Africa in November 1942, and the subsequent occupation of French Morocco. In February 1943, he was promoted to brigadier general.

In April 1943, Brigadier General Macon was appointed as assistant division commander (ADC) of the 83rd Infantry Division.  He succeeded Frank W. Milburn as commanding general of the division in January 1944 and was promoted to major general on June 1, 1944.

Major General Macon commanded the 83rd Infantry Division during operations in Normandy, including Operation Cobra and the Battle of Saint-Malo.  The division then screened the Allied advance along the Loire River Valley, and accepted the surrender of 20,000 German troops at Beaugency.  The division drove through Lorraine and into Luxembourg, and then fought in the Battle of the Bulge.  In 1945, the division advanced through Germany and linked up with Soviet troops on the Elbe in April. Throughout this period, from the time he assumed command of the 83rd Division, his ADC was Brigadier General Claude Birkett Ferenbaugh.

Later years
Major General Macon remained in command of the 83rd Division until 1946, when he became military attaché in the U.S. Embassy in Moscow, USSR.  He served there from 1946 to 1948, and then became Deputy Chief, U.S. Army Field Forces from 1949 to 1952.  He retired in July 1952.

Decorations

Promotions
Source - Register of the Army of the United States for 1946. United States Government Printing Office Washington: U.S. Secretary of War. 1946. p. 430

Note - Macon accepted his commission December 1, 1916

References

 R. Manning Ancell, Biographical Dictionary of World War II Generals and Flag Officers (1996)
 Shelby Stanton, World War II Order of Battle (1984)

External links
Generals of World War II

1890 births
1980 deaths
United States Army Infantry Branch personnel
Military personnel from Washington, D.C.
People from Washington, D.C.
Virginia Tech alumni
Virginia Tech Hokies football players
United States Army War College alumni
United States Army generals
Recipients of the Distinguished Service Medal (US Army)
Recipients of the Silver Star
Recipients of the Legion of Merit
United States Army generals of World War II
United States Army personnel of World War I
Virginia Tech faculty
United States military attachés